The 2022–23 season is the 141st season in the existence of Queens Park Rangers Football Club and the club's eighth consecutive season in the Championship. In addition to the league, they will also compete in the 2022–23 FA Cup and the 2022–23 EFL Cup.

First team squad

Kit
Supplier: Erreà / Sponsor: Convivia

Kit information
QPR agreed a multi-year partnership with Erreà as the official technical kit suppliers, the 2022–23 season will be the sixth year of the deal. The kits will be 100 percent bespoke designs for the duration of the deal. On 8 December 2022 QPR announced that the kit deal with Erreà had been extended until the end of the 2025/26 season.

On 27 June 2022 Convivia were announced as the main shirt sponsor for the 2022–23 season on a three-year deal.

Transfers

In

Out

Loans in

Loans out

Friendlies
On 9 June QPR announced they would play two pre-season friendly games in Germany. A third friendly, back in the UK against Wealdstone was later confirmed. A fourth confirmed friendly followed four days later, against Crawley Town. The final confirmed friendly was announced on 4 July, against Crystal Palace.

During the 2022 FIFA World Cup winter break, the R's confirmed a friendly against Livingston.

Competitions

Overall record

Championship

League table

Results summary

Results by round

Matches

On 23 June, the league fixtures were announced.

FA Cup

The R's were drawn away to Fleetwood Town in the round third.

EFL Cup

QPR were drawn away to Charlton Athletic in the first round.

Squad statistics

Statistics

|-

|-
! colspan="14" style="background:#dcdcdc; text-align:center"| Left During the Season

|}

Goals

Clean sheets

References

External links

Queens Park Rangers F.C. seasons
Queens Park Rangers
Queens Park Rangers
Queens Park Rangers
English football clubs 2022–23 season